Louis van Assenburgh (also Assenborch, Assenburg), ( 1657 – 27 December 1711), Governor of the Cape Colony between 1708 and 1711.

Early life
Van Assenburgh was the son of Pieter van Assenburgh and his wife, Susanna Houwens and was baptized on 23 December 1657 in the Westerkerk, Amsterdam. Before he joined the VOC, Van Assenburgh served under the 'Kaiser of the Donou'.

Career
Van Assenbugh was appointed as successor to Governor W. A. van der Stel and he left the Netherlands on 19 May 1707. As the ship sailed via Brazil, he only reached the Cape only 25 January 1708 and on the 1st of February he was introduced to the inhabitants of Cape by the secunde and acting governor, Johan Cornelis d'Ableing.

At the beginning of his term as governor, Van Assenburgh had the difficult task at appease the anger of the dissatisfied burghers caused by the revolt and dismissal of W. A. van der Stel and he had to ensure that the people  adhere to the commands of the Lords XVII (Heren XVII). Among other things, he dealt with disputes between burghers and officials, stopped smuggling, introduced new licensing conditions for auctions and made improvements in the care of the sick. The people of the Cape were generally satisfied with his actions.

However, the former governor-general, Joan van Hoorn, who visited the Cape in 1710, criticized Van Assenburgh's rule in a letter addressed to his father-in-law, Abraham van Riebeeck. Van Hoorn accused Van Assenburgh, who was unmarried, of consorting with women of ill repute, being fond of frivolous entertainments and that the Cape had a general air of neglect. Although Van Assenburgh was accused of indecisive and improper conduct, it was because of his efforts that the Cape burghers became reconciled once again to the authority of the VOC.

Death
Van Assenburgh was bed-ridden for eight months before his death. He signed his last will and testament exactly a month before he died on 27 December 1711.

See also
 1700s in South Africa
 1710s in South Africa

References

1657 births
1711 deaths
Dutch East India Company people from Amsterdam
18th-century Dutch colonial governors
Governors of the Dutch Cape Colony